Eric Craig Staal (born October 29, 1984) is a Canadian professional ice hockey center for the Florida Panthers of the National Hockey League (NHL). He has previously played for the Carolina Hurricanes, New York Rangers, Minnesota Wild, Buffalo Sabres and Montreal Canadiens. Eric is the oldest of the Staal brothers, which includes current teammate Marc and former teammates Jordan and Jared.

Staal is a member of the Triple Gold Club, having won the Stanley Cup with the Hurricanes in 2006, and both the 2007 World Championships and the 2010 Winter Olympics with Team Canada.

Early life
Staal was born in Thunder Bay, Ontario, the son of sod farmers Henry and Linda Staal. All four of his grandparents were Dutch immigrants. He started playing hockey at the age of four, and along with learning how to operate farming tools he played in a home ice rink with his three younger brothers. His idols growing up were forwards Joe Sakic and Wayne Gretzky. Staal took his jersey number 12 from what his father wore when he played hockey for the Lakehead Thunderwolves from 1978 to 1983.

Playing career

Early career
Staal grew up playing minor hockey in Thunder Bay, played AAA for the Thunder Bay Kings organization and led his Bantam team to an All-Ontario Championship in the 1999–2000 season. After the season, Staal was selected in the first round, 13th overall, in the 2000 Ontario Hockey League (OHL) Priority Selection by the Peterborough Petes. While not even his father, Henry, thought he may have been ready for the OHL, Staal finished his first season with 49 points in 63 games. His scoring totals increased the following season when he recorded 62 points.

In his draft year, Staal led the Petes in scoring with 39 goals and 98 points. He was named to the Canadian Hockey League (CHL) First All-Star Team as well as the OHL Second All-Star Team. Staal also skated in the CHL Top Prospects Game, recording one assist.

Professional

Carolina Hurricanes (2003–2016)
Staal was selected second overall in the 2003 NHL Entry Draft by the Carolina Hurricanes, behind number one pick Marc-André Fleury. He played his first season in the NHL right after being drafted. In 2004, Staal played in the YoungStars Game as part of the 2004 NHL All-Star festivities.

As the 2004–05 season was cancelled due to a lock-out, Staal spent the year with the Hurricanes' American Hockey League (AHL) affiliate, the Lowell Lock Monsters. He established new franchise records in points (77), assists (51), plus-minus (+37) and 
shorthanded goals (7) in a season, and was also called for the AHL All Star Classic.

In the 2005–06 season, Staal scored a career-high 100 points during the regular season and was named NHL Offensive Player of the Week of October 23–30, 2005, the same week in which he scored his first career hat-trick, coming against the Philadelphia Flyers. He then led the Hurricanes in points during the 2006 Stanley Cup playoffs with 28 as they won the Stanley Cup. After the season, Staal finished fourth in voting for the Hart Memorial Trophy, awarded to the NHL's most valuable player (MVP). Following the successful season, on July 1, 2006, Staal signed a three-year, $13.5 million contract extension with the Hurricanes.

Staal made his first All-Star Game appearance in 2007 All-Star Game in Dallas, where he scored the Eastern Conference's third goal. His overall production dipped from the previous season, recording just 70 points.

On January 27, 2008, at the 2008 NHL All-Star Game in Atlanta, Staal recorded two goals and an assist. He was also awarded the MVP award for the event.

On September 11, 2008, Staal signed a seven-year, $57.75 million extension with the Hurricanes, which was to begin in the 2009–10 season. Staal was slated to become a restricted free agent on July 1, 2009, but signed despite having one year at $5 million remaining on his former contract.

On April 28, 2009, Staal capped an improbable comeback by scoring the series-winning goal with 31.7 seconds remaining in Game 7 of Carolina's first-round series of the 2009 playoffs against the New Jersey Devils. His game-winning goal led to the comeback victory being nicknamed “"Shock at the Rock". The Hurricanes went as far as the Eastern Conference Finals, ultimately losing to the eventual Stanley Cup champions, the Pittsburgh Penguins.

On May 8, 2009, Staal scored twice to earn 40 career post-season points, eclipsing Ron Francis' franchise mark of 39.

On January 20, 2010, Staal was named team captain, replacing Rod Brind'Amour, who was named an alternate captain. Staal became the fifth captain since the team relocated to the city of Raleigh, North Carolina, from Hartford.

On January 18, 2011, Staal was named one of two team captains for 2011 NHL All-Star Game, held in the Hurricanes' home city of Raleigh. In the Game, Team Staal fell 10–11 to Team Lidstrom, captained by the Detroit Red Wings' Nicklas Lidström.

New York Rangers (2016)
On February 28, 2016, Staal, in the final year of his contract, was traded to the New York Rangers in exchange for Aleksi Saarela and two second-round draft picks (2016 and 2017). Eric joined brother Marc in New York, but struggled for the Rangers, recording six points in 20 regular season games, and zero points in a five-game loss to the Pittsburgh Penguins in the first round of the Stanley Cup Playoffs.

Minnesota Wild (2016–2020)
During the subsequent offseason, Staal, as a free agent, signed a three-year contract with the Minnesota Wild on July 1, 2016. In his first season with the Wild, Staal recorded 28 goals and 65 points.

The 2017–18 season was a memorable one for Staal as he played his 1,000th game on March 19, 2017, and was also invited to his fifth NHL All-Star Game. Staal ended the season registering 42 goals, having his first 40 plus goal season since 2008–09.

On February 25, 2019, Staal agreed to a two-year, $6.5 million extension with the Wild. On December 15, 2019, Staal became the 89th player all-time to score 1000 career points.

Buffalo Sabres (2020–2021)
After completing his fourth season with the Wild and entering his final season under contract, Staal was traded by Minnesota to the Buffalo Sabres in exchange for forward Marcus Johansson on September 16, 2020.

Montreal Canadiens (2021)
On March 26, 2021, the Buffalo Sabres traded Staal to the Montreal Canadiens in exchange for third and fifth-round picks in the 2021 NHL Entry Draft.

Later years and Florida Panthers (2022–present)
As a free agent from the Canadiens, Staal remained un-signed leading into the  season. Harbouring ambitions to represent Team Canada at the 2022 Winter Olympics, Staal resumed his professional career by agreeing to a professional try-out contract with the Iowa Wild of the AHL, an affiliate of former club the Minnesota Wild, on January 13, 2022. Staal made his debut for Iowa the following day, collecting a goal and assist against the Chicago Wolves in marking his first AHL game in over 16 years. In 4 appearances with the Iowa Wild, Staal collected 2 goals and 5 points before he was released from his tryout on January 23, 2022.

Staal did not play an NHL game in the 2021–22 season. In July 2022, Staal signed a professional tryout contract (PTO) with the Florida Panthers, joining along with his brother Marc. Shortly after that, Staal signed a one-year contract with Florida.

International play
 

Staal received his first calls to Team Canada for the 2007 World Championships in Moscow. Along with younger brother Jordan, he won gold in a 4–2 win against Finland, scoring five goals, including the overtime winner in the quarter-finals over the Czech Republic. In the following year, Staal was back with Team Canada at the 2008 World Championships in Quebec City, winning a silver medal. He scored eight goals in the tournament, four of them in Canada's 10–1 defeat of Germany.

Four years after being named only for Canada's taxi squad for the 2006 Winter Olympics, Staal was selected for the Canadian team at the 2010 Winter Olympics in Vancouver. He became a starter alongside Sidney Crosby and Jarome Iginla, and scored one goal and five assists on the path to a gold medal. The Olympic title added to previous NHL and World Championship wins, made Staal the 23rd player in the Triple Gold Club.

Staal was named captain of Team Canada in the 2013 World Championships in Stockholm. He would get injured in the first period of the quarter-finals, which Canada ended up losing to eventual champions Sweden, after a knee-on-knee hit by defenceman Alexander Edler.

In 2022, Staal captained Team Canada to a sixth place finish at the 2022 Winter Olympics.

Personal life

Staal married his longtime girlfriend, Tanya Van den Broeke on August 3, 2007. The couple have three sons and reside in Edina, Minnesota. Staal is a Christian.

Records
 Carolina Hurricanes' franchise record for most hat tricks in a single season – 4 (2008–09)
 Carolina Hurricanes' franchise record for most career post-season points – 43
 Carolina Hurricanes' franchise record for consecutive games – 349 (2004–2009)
 Tied Minnesota Wild's franchise record for most goals in a single season – 42 (2017–18)

Career statistics

Regular season and playoffs
Bold indicates led league

International

Awards and honours

See also
List of NHL players with 100-point seasons
List of NHL players with 1,000 points
List of NHL players with 1,000 games played

References

External links
 

1984 births
Buffalo Sabres players
Canadian ice hockey centres
Canadian people of Dutch descent
Carolina Hurricanes captains
Carolina Hurricanes draft picks
Carolina Hurricanes players
Florida Panthers players
Ice hockey people from Ontario
Ice hockey players at the 2010 Winter Olympics
Iowa Wild players
Living people
Lowell Lock Monsters players
Medalists at the 2010 Winter Olympics
Minnesota Wild players
Montreal Canadiens players
National Hockey League All-Stars
National Hockey League first-round draft picks
New York Rangers players
Olympic gold medalists for Canada
Olympic ice hockey players of Canada
Olympic medalists in ice hockey
Peterborough Petes (ice hockey) players
Sportspeople from Thunder Bay
Eric
Stanley Cup champions
Triple Gold Club
Ice hockey players at the 2022 Winter Olympics
Canadian expatriate ice hockey players in the United States